The Panther De Ville is a neo-classic luxury vehicle which was produced by Panther Westwinds, a British speciality car maker, from 1974 to 1985. The De Ville was conceived by Robert Jankel to appeal to the taste of nouveau riche customers, including singer Elton John and actor Oliver Reed.  About 60 De Villes were hand-built, including eleven two-door convertibles (for many years Britain's most expensive listed production car), and one pink and gold six-door limousine.

The flowing wing lines and big headlights of the De Ville were styled to imitate the Bugatti Royale. The cockpit of the De Ville was modern, without the exterior's pretense of pre-war styling.

The Panther De Ville was equipped with Jaguar suspension, power steering and automatic transmission, so it was an easy car to drive and quite quick, although poor aerodynamics tended to keep the top speed low. Interiors were lavish and often featured TV sets and drinks bars. The doors of the De Ville were from the BMC 1800 family car.

A Panther De Ville was used in Disney's live-action movies 101 Dalmatians (1996), 102 Dalmatians (2000) and two De Ville's for the film  Cruella (2021) as Cruella de Vil's car. The Jaguar engine in the car was replaced with a small-block Chevrolet V8 to better withstand the rigours of stunt driving. The Panther de Ville was hand painted by Alexander Mitchell.

Sources and further reading

De Ville
Retro-style automobiles
Luxury vehicles
1980s cars
Cars introduced in 1974